Goldpan Provincial Park is a provincial park in British Columbia, Canada, located on the Trans-Canada Highway between Lytton (W) and Spences Bridge (E), on the Thompson River.  The park has camping above the highway and a picnic area and riverfront below.

See also
Shaw Springs
Bighorn, British Columbia

References

Provincial parks of British Columbia
Thompson Country
1956 establishments in British Columbia
Protected areas established in 1956